is a former professional sumo wrestler from Lesozavodsk, Primorsky Krai, Russia.  After an initial influx of Russian wrestlers from the early 2000s, he was the last ethnic Russian in top level sumo. He made his debut in May 2002 and, after a serious knee injury in 2012 sent him down the rankings, reached the top makuuchi division in November 2014. His highest rank was maegashira 5. He had nine tournaments ranked in the top division, but finished his career in the third highest makushita division.

Early life and sumo background
Ivanov had no exposure to sumo in early life, though he was active in boxing during his student years.  Later, his brother-in-law, who was Japanese, recommended he give sumo a try. With the help of the professional wrestler Akira Taue he was able to make a contact with former sekiwake Masurao, who was the owner of Onomatsu stable. He came to Japan and joined sumo together with the two Russian brothers who would join Kitanoumi stable and take the ring names Rohō and Hakurozan. His ring name is derived from the Amur River in his region of Russia, and the three Chinese characters that comprise it are the first character in Onomatsu, the character for dream to represent Ivanov's dream of coming to Japan as a sumo wrestler, and the character used to represent Russia. The name was devised by the Japanese poet Daizaburō Nakayama.

Career

Until he reached the sandanme division he advanced at a steady rate, but still being only around 90 kilograms with a tall thin build, his advance slowed and for the next four years he traveled back and forth between the sandanme and makushita divisions. The brothers Rohō and Hakurozan had by this time already become regulars in the salaried ranks. However, Amūru gradually started to put on weight and by 2008 had become a makushita regular. It was in this year that the other three ethnic Russian wrestlers (Wakanohō was the third) were expelled for cannabis use, leaving Amūru as the only ethnic Russian in professional sumo.

He worked his way slowly up through this division, but in July 2010 at his highest rank yet of makushita 8, he seriously injured his right knee, tearing ligaments against future top division wrestler Masunoyama and was out for the rest of the tournament. This would be the beginning of his injury troubles.  He also missed the November 2010 and January 2011 tournaments due to the injury.  He opted against surgery, fearing he would be out for so long that he would fall off the banzuke completely,  and instead worked on rehabilitating his knee injury. He had fallen to the middle ranks of sandanme by the time he was able to return in May 2011, but managed a 6-1 record.  In the following July 2011 tournament he won all seven of his bouts and a playoff to take the sandanme championship, the first of his career. This skyrocketed him back to his career best rank of makushita 8 for the September tournament where he achieved a 5-2 record.  He followed this with a 6-1 record and a second chance at a championship before losing on the final day in a playoff against Shōsei.

This record would allow him to finally be promoted to the professional ranks of jūryō for the January 2012 tournament. This achievement took him 57 tournaments, the second slowest promotion for a foreign born wrestler to the sekitori ranks after the Brazilian Wakaazuma who took 58 tournaments.  His jūryō debut was impressive, as he only had one loss in the first 11 days.  However, on the 12th day, in a loss to Kotoyūki, he seriously re-injured his right knee, and was out of the tournament.  He had surgery on his knee in March of the same year, and then focused on rehabilitation. He would not return to the ring for the next five tournaments.

He dropped all the way to the ranks of jonidan by the time he was finally able to come back. His return was impressive however, as he chalked up a 7-0 perfect record and took the championship for the division. After this return, he had a strong showing in every subsequent tournament, never losing more than 2 bouts in 7, as he rose up again through the unsalaried ranks.  He reached jūryō again in March 2014 and four consecutive winning tournaments, culminating in a 9-6 record at jūryō 1 saw him promoted to the makuuchi top division for the November 2014 tournament. He could only manage five wins against ten losses in his makuuchi debut however, and was relegated back to the second division for the January 2015 tournament.

Amūru made an immediate return to the top division after securing eight wins at jūryō 1 and in May 2015 recorded his first winning score in makuuchi. After two more winning records in July and September he reached his highest rank to date of maegashira 5 in the November tournament. He withdrew from the May 2016 tournament on the second day after suffering an injury, but returned from the seventh day. He ended the tournament with only three wins and was relegated to jūryō after a run of eight tournaments in the top division. He lost sekitori status after the January 2017 tournament when a 5–10 record at Jūryō 10 saw him demoted to makushita.

Retirement
Amūru announced his retirement at a press conference at the beginning of the May 2018 tournament, citing a left shoulder injury that had reduced his power. His danpatsu-shiki was held on June 16, 2018. He said he hopes to become a sports trainer. As of 2020 he was working in a gym in Chiba Prefecture, and he teaches traditional sumo movements in both Russian and Japanese online. He has lost around  since his retirement.

Fighting style
Amūru was a yotsu–sumo wrestler who preferred a hidari–yotsu, or right hand outside and left hand inside grip on his opponent's mawashi. His most common winning kimarite were yorikiri or force out (which accounted for over 40% of his wins), hatakikomi or slap down and okuridashi or rear push out.

Career record

See also
Glossary of sumo terms
List of past sumo wrestlers
List of non-Japanese sumo wrestlers

References

External links
 

1983 births
Living people
Russian sumo wrestlers
People from Lesozavodsk
Sportspeople from Primorsky Krai